Fredhead is the fourth album by British pop group Right Said Fred. It peaked at #2 on the German Albums Chart. The album yielded three singles: "Mojive", the single in the UK Top 20 "You're My Mate" and "Love Song".

Track listing
"You're My Mate"
"Mojive"
"Angel Dust"
"Funk You"
"I Know What Love Is"
"Lap Dance Junkie"
"Lovers.com"
"Bring Your Smile"
"Like a Woman"
"Jamaica Jerk"
"The Sun Changes Everything"
"Insatiable You"
"Love Song"
"Mojive (Reprise)"
"I'm Too Sexy"
"Don't Talk Just Kiss"

Charts

Weekly charts

Year-end charts

References

2001 albums
Right Said Fred albums